Gavin Adrian Wanganeen (born 18 June 1973) is a former Australian rules footballer who played for the Essendon Football Club and Port Adelaide Football Club in the Australian Football League (AFL), and also for the Port Adelaide Magpies in the South Australian National Football League (SANFL).

A Brownlow Medal winner and Australian Football Hall of Fame inductee, Wanganeen was appointed Port Adelaide's inaugural captain upon entry into the AFL in 1997 and is the first Indigenous Australian footballer to win the Brownlow Medal and reach the 300-game milestone at senior VFL/AFL level. Since retirement, Wanganeen has taken up painting. He is a descendant of the Kokatha people, a Western Desert people of South Australia, an inheritance he has explored in his art work since retirement. He has had two solo exhibitions and was an ambassador for the Adelaide Fringe in 2019.

Early life
Wanganeen was born in Mount Gambier to a footballing family: his great-grandfather had played for the local team, Koonibba Football Club, at the Koonibba mission near Ceduna. 

His family moved from Mount Gambier to Port Lincoln for a few years. When Wanganeen was five, they moved again to Salisbury, a northern suburb of Adelaide.

Wanganeen played junior football for Adelaide based South Australian Amateur Football League club Salisbury North and attended Salisbury East High School.

At the age of 14, Wanganeen joined the Port Adelaide Under 17s side in the SANFL.

Football career

Port Adelaide: 1990 
Wanganeen made his senior SANFL debut with Port Adelaide in 1990 at only 16 years of age. The 1990 SANFL season was the last year that the competition was the highest level of football in South Australia. He played 24 matches and kicked 46 goals, winning the SANFL Rookie of the Year award, starring in Port Adelaide's 1990 SANFL Grand Final win kicking two goals.

Essendon: 1991–1996
Wanganeen's potential was identified early by Essendon, and after losing another South Australian star, Craig Bradley, to Carlton, Bombers coach Kevin Sheedy was determined to secure Wanganeen. As he recalled in an interview for The Football Record: 

We always knew he was an exciting talent. We had spotted him very early and watched his progress through the Port Adelaide Reserves to the seniors and knew he would make the grade at AFL level. A lot of people told us he would not shift from Adelaide, but I suppose that only made us all the more determined to get him across. 

After doing a deal with Melbourne, Essendon secured Wanganeen with Pick number 12 in the 1989 VFL Draft. Wanganeen debuted for the club in 1991, Round 2 in a win against Richmond. He immediately finding a niche as an attacking defender, and his handsome appearance made him popular with female supporters. 

Essendon came from the clouds in 1993 to win their 15th VFL/AFL premiership with a team that became known as the 'Baby Bombers'. Wanganeen enjoyed a special year individually, with his fearless attacking approach from defence typical of Essendon's play that season. He would end up winning the first of his five All-Australian jumpers, then followed by winning the 1993 Brownlow Medal, polling 18 votes (which included four counts of three votes late in the season) to edge out Carlton's Greg Williams (who would win his second Brownlow the following season), and North Melbourne's Wayne Carey. At 20 years of age, Wanganeen was the youngest winner of the League's best and fairest award since Fitzroy's Denis Ryan in 1936.

He was also a key player in South Australia's State of Origin Carnival Championship, and Essendon's Premiership win that year. In 2002, Wanganeen was voted the 19th best Essendon player of all time in the "Champions of Essendon" list.

Port Adelaide return: 1997–2006
Wanganeen returned to Port Adelaide in 1997 as the club's 59th captain and its inaugural captain in the AFL. He received 11 Brownlow votes for the year, but after his first season injuries conspired to minimise his impact. He relinquished the Port Adelaide captaincy at the end of the 2000 AFL season which saw a return to his best form. In 2003 Wanganeen was favourite to once again win the Brownlow (he finished equal second). In 2004 Wanganeen won his second premiership medal in Port's first AFL premiership side. Wanganeen played his 300th AFL game in the 2006 season, but then injured his right knee in a SANFL game for the Port Adelaide Magpies, which led him to retire from football. Wanganeen was the first Aboriginal player to play 300 AFL games. He was honoured by the Power by the naming of the best under 21 medal after him, the Gavin Wanganeen Medal.

After football
In 2013, Wanganeen was focused on business interests involving ownership of three Anytime Fitness centres at Modbury, Port Adelaide and Essendon.

He served as a voluntary ambassador for the Australian branch of the White Ribbon Campaign, a men's campaign that tackles violence against women, and participated in the 2013 "Cycling for Culture" event to draw attention to the importance of language and culture to Aboriginal well-being, specifically to attract funds to contributing to the further development of the Kaurna language.

In 2013, Wanganeen was appointed senior coach of Pulteney Grammar School's football team.

In 2021, Wanganeen competed on Australian Survivor: Brains V Brawn as part of the Brawn tribe. After his tribe lost the immunity challenge on day 7, Wanganeen got voted out, being the third person voted out and placing 22nd.

Art
Wanganeen found a new passion following the closure of his football career and has become an accomplished visual artist, with two solo exhibitions by 2018 and much of his artwork decorating his home in suburban Adelaide.

In February 2019, Wanganeen was appointed one of three Fringe Ambassadors for the Adelaide Fringe, where he appeared in conversation with Holly Ransom for the Fringe Talk Show.

His second exhibition, Through the Stars, was part of the South Australian Living Artists Festival in Adelaide.

Other
The Gavin Wanganeen Indigenous Scholarship (GWIS) was established at the University of South Australia in 2005 to support disadvantaged Indigenous students to complete a university degree.

The Gavin Wanganeen Medal, for the Best player under 21, was instituted at PAFC in 2006.

Personal life
Wanganeen has two children, a daughter (Mia) and a son with his first wife, Stephanie Richards. Their son Tex moved to Melbourne in 2020 to board at Xavier College and play for the Oakleigh Chargers in the NAB League. He also spent time at Essendon's father-son academy. 

In July 2012, Wanganeen married Pippa Hanson. Together the couple have four daughters.

He is the first cousin of AFL players and brothers Aaron and Alwyn Davey, and a third cousin of Rabbit Proof Fence actress Natasha Wanganeen.

Football statistics

|- style="background-color: #EAEAEA"
! scope="row" style="text-align:center" | 1991
|style="text-align:center;"|
| 4 || 18 || 12 || 13 || 155 || 89 || 244 || 39 || 38 || 0.7 || 0.7 || 8.6 || 4.9 || 13.6 || 2.2 || 2.1
|-
! scope="row" style="text-align:center" | 1992
|style="text-align:center;"|
| 4 || 21 || 11 || 17 || 238 || 121 || 359 || 55 || 73 || 0.5 || 0.8 || 11.3 || 5.8 || 17.1 || 2.6 || 3.5
|- style="background:#eaeaea;"
|style="text-align:center;background:#afe6ba;"|1993†
|style="text-align:center;"|
| 4 || 22 || 5 || 3 || 267 || 146 || 413 || 69 || 30 || 0.2 || 0.1 || 12.1 || 6.6 || 18.8 || 3.1 || 1.4
|-
! scope="row" style="text-align:center" | 1994
|style="text-align:center;"|
| 4 || 22 || 12 || 9 || 286 || 101 || 387 || 82 || 42 || 0.5 || 0.4 || 13.0 || 4.6 || 17.6 || 3.7 || 1.9
|- style="background:#eaeaea;"
! scope="row" style="text-align:center" | 1995
|style="text-align:center;"|
| 4 || 23 || 10 || 10 || 267 || 124 || 391 || 60 || 27 || 0.4 || 0.4 || 11.6 || 5.4 || 17.0 || 2.6 || 1.2
|-
! scope="row" style="text-align:center" | 1996
|style="text-align:center;"|
| 4 || 21 || 14 || 8 || 242 || 111 || 353 || 64 || 43 || 0.7 || 0.4 || 11.5 || 5.3 || 16.8 || 3.0 || 2.0
|- style="background:#eaeaea;"
! scope="row" style="text-align:center" | 1997
|style="text-align:center;"|
| 1 || 20 || 14 || 6 || 219 || 129 || 348 || 49 || 28 || 0.7 || 0.3 || 11.0 || 6.5 || 17.4 || 2.5 || 1.4
|-
! scope="row" style="text-align:center" | 1998
|style="text-align:center;"|
| 1 || 15 || 8 || 9 || 176 || 60 || 236 || 52 || 28 || 0.5 || 0.6 || 11.7 || 4.0 || 15.7 || 3.5 || 1.9
|- style="background:#eaeaea;"
! scope="row" style="text-align:center" | 1999
|style="text-align:center;"|
| 1 || 16 || 5 || 4 || 193 || 92 || 285 || 59 || 15 || 0.3 || 0.3 || 12.1 || 5.8 || 17.8 || 3.7 || 0.9
|-
! scope="row" style="text-align:center" | 2000
|style="text-align:center;"|
| 1 || 10 || 6 || 5 || 120 || 55 || 175 || 36 || 9 || 0.6 || 0.5 || 12.0 || 5.5 || 17.5 || 3.6 || 0.9
|- style="background:#eaeaea;"
! scope="row" style="text-align:center" | 2001
|style="text-align:center;"|
| 4 || 24 || 41 || 22 || 256 || 109 || 365 || 75 || 26 || 1.7 || 0.9 || 10.7 || 4.5 || 15.2 || 3.1 || 1.1
|-
! scope="row" style="text-align:center" | 2002
|style="text-align:center;"|
| 4 || 20 || 12 || 7 || 201 || 83 || 284 || 64 || 21 || 0.6 || 0.4 || 10.1 || 4.2 || 14.2 || 3.2 || 1.1
|- style="background:#eaeaea;"
! scope="row" style="text-align:center" | 2003
|style="text-align:center;"|
| 4 || 25 || 15 || 18 || 433 || 91 || 524 || 161 || 33 || 0.6 || 0.7 || 17.3 || 3.6 || 21.0 || 6.4 || 1.3
|-
|style="text-align:center;background:#afe6ba;"|2004†
|style="text-align:center;"|
| 4 || 19 || 24 || 10 || 193 || 103 || 296 || 86 || 17 || 1.3 || 0.5 || 10.2 || 5.4 || 15.6 || 4.5 || 0.9
|- style="background:#eaeaea;"
! scope="row" style="text-align:center" | 2005
|style="text-align:center;"|
| 4 || 23 || 13 || 8 || 227 || 135 || 362 || 75 || 29 || 0.6 || 0.3 || 9.9 || 5.9 || 15.7 || 3.3 || 1.3
|-
! scope="row" style="text-align:center" | 2006
|style="text-align:center;"|
| 4 || 1 || 0 || 0 || 0 || 9 || 9 || 1 || 1 || 0.0 || 0.0 || 0.0 || 9.0 || 9.0 || 1.0 || 1.0
|- class="sortbottom"
! colspan=3| Career
! 300
! 202
! 149
! 3473
! 1558
! 5031
! 1027
! 460
! 0.7
! 0.5
! 11.6
! 5.2
! 16.8
! 3.4
! 1.5
|}

Football honours and achievements

Essendon
Team
AFL Premiership (Essendon): 1993
McClelland Trophy (Essendon): 1993
Pre-Season Cup (Essendon): 1993, 1994
Individual
Champions of Essendon - No. 19
Essendon F.C. Team of the Century - Back Pocket

Port Adelaide
Team
AFL Premiership (Port Adelaide): 2004
SANFL Premiership (Port Adelaide): 1990
McClelland Trophy (Port Adelaide): 2002, 2003, 2004
Pre-Season Cup (Port Adelaide): 2001, 2002
Individual
John Cahill Medal (Port Adelaide F.C. Best & Fairest): 2003
Port Adelaide F.C. Captain: 1997–2000
Port Adelaide F.C Life Membership Recipient: 2006
SANFL Rookie of the Year: 1990

Other individual awards
Brownlow Medal: 1993
All-Australian: 1992, 1993, 1995, 2001, 2003
Michael Tuck Medal: 1993
Inside Football - Player of the Year:2003
Deadly Awards - Most Outstanding Achievement in AFL: 2004
Indigenous Team of the Century - Half-Back FlankAFL Life Membership Recipient''': 2004

See also
Gavin Wanganeen Medal

References

External links

Australian rules footballers from Adelaide
Essendon Football Club players
Essendon Football Club Premiership players
Port Adelaide Football Club players
Port Adelaide Football Club Premiership players
Brownlow Medal winners
All-Australians (AFL)
South Australian State of Origin players
Champions of Essendon
John Cahill Medal winners
Port Adelaide Football Club (SANFL) players
Port Adelaide Football Club players (all competitions)
Port Adelaide Magpies players
Indigenous Australian players of Australian rules football
Australian Football Hall of Fame inductees
South Australian Football Hall of Fame inductees
1973 births
Living people
21st-century Australian male artists
Australian Aboriginal artists
Australian Survivor contestants
Two-time VFL/AFL Premiership players
People from Mount Gambier, South Australia
Artists from Adelaide
21st-century Australian painters